Events in the year 2018 in the Central African Republic.

Incumbents
 President: Faustin-Archange Touadéra 
 Prime Minister: Simplice Sarandji

Events
Ongoing – Central African Republic Civil War

31 October to 17 November – 2018 Batangafo clashes

Deaths
18 March – Michel Adama-Tamboux, politician (b. 1928).

References

 
2010s in the Central African Republic
Years of the 21st century in the Central African Republic
Central African Republic
Central African Republic